Emeliana Aiza Parada (born 10 May 1980) is a Bolivian politician and trade unionist who served as a party-list member of the Chamber of Deputies from Potosí from 2010 to 2015. A member of the Movement for Socialism, she previously represented Potosí's circumscription 41 as a substitute under Severo Pacaja from 2006 to 2010.

Orphaned at a young age, Aiza spent much of her early life working agricultural and farming jobs in her rural community. Starting in the late 1990s, she began rising through the ranks of northern Potosí's trade syndicates, capping off her union career as a member of the Chayanta Regional Women's Center. The position opened the way for a career in politics, a product of the peasant movement's alignment with the Movement for Socialism.

In 2005, following an unsuccessful bid for a seat on the Ocurí Municipal Council, Aiza was elected as a substitute member of the Chamber of Deputies. She won her own seat in the 2009 election, becoming one of the rare few members of the Movement for Socialism to achieve reelection. Elected deputy leader of her party's caucus in the lower chamber, Aiza twice assumed full leadership due to the resignation or absence of her predecessors. She was not nominated for a third term.

Early life and career 
Emeliana Aiza was born on 10 May 1980 in Huayraña, a small Quechua community situated in the Ocurí Municipality, part of the Chayanta Province of northern Potosí, one of the poorest and least economically developed regions of the country. The eldest of three sisters, Aiza spent a large part of her early life as head of household, a situation brought about by the death of both her parents, which left her orphaned at the age of 8. She dropped out of school to focus on working, making a modest living cultivating potatoes and attending to the livestock of her neighbors. Eventually, Aiza and her sisters saved enough money to set up their own small farm, allowing them to live independently of others.

Starting from the late 1990s, Aiza began assuming roles within her area's local peasant unions. She got her start in 1999 as a member of her community's syndicate, where she served as Huayraña's representative before larger unions. In 2000, she joined the provincial women's union and two years later acceded to the directorate of the Chayanta Regional Women's Center. During this time, she also attained membership within the Bartolina Sisa Confederation, the country's national women's organization.

Chamber of Deputies

Election 

Aiza's first foray into electoral politics came in 2004, when she was nominated to contest a seat on the Ocurí Municipal Council. Although unsuccessful in that endeavor, her name was kept in consideration for other posts, and in 2005, she was nominated for a seat in the Chamber of Deputies in representation of the Movement for Socialism (MAS-IPSP).

As a product of its close alliance with the peasant movement, the MAS granted rural trade syndicates ample autonomy to select their own candidates in single-member constituencies. The pair jointly contested the country's 41st circumscription and were elected to represent Potosí's Chayanta Province in the lower chamber.

In 2009, Aiza was nominated for reelection as a full member of the Chamber of Deputies, a selection almost unheard of within the MAS, which had opted to near-entirely renew its parliamentary lists that cycle. Unlike in 2005, where she ran individually, this time, Aiza was incorporated onto the MAS's electoral list. Although disadvantaged by a bottom placement on the party's slate of candidates, she won nonetheless, owing to Evo Morales's near-eighty-percent victory in Potosí, which garnered the MAS an almost clean sweep of the department's parliamentary delegation.

Tenure 
Shortly after assuming office, Aiza was elected to serve as deputy leader of the MAS caucus in the Chamber of Deputies. Her service as second-in-command to leader Rebeca Delgado lasted until early June, at which point Aiza succeeded Delgado following the latter's surprise resignation. In her place, Edwin Tupa was elected to lead the MAS caucus, while Aiza returned to her former position as deputy leader. However, Tupa's own troubles forced him to take an extended leave of absence, leading Aiza to once again assume the post of caucus leader for the duration of 2011.

Unlike in 2009, Aiza was not nominated for reelection to a third term in 2014, concluding her active participation in politics. In addition to public service, Aiza's decade-long political career provided opportunities for her to complete the education she was forced to abandon in her youth. In 2004, in representation of a regional workers' federation, she participated in the first-ever Leadership for Transformation program, a political education course sponsored by the IDEA Foundation and the CAF – Development Bank. Similarly, during her time as a member of the Chamber of Deputies, Aiza simultaneously took night courses at La Paz's Gualberto Villarroel School, from which she graduated in 2013.

Commission assignments 
 Constitution, Legislation, and Electoral System Commission
 Constitutional Review and Legislative Harmonization Committee (2013–2014)
 Planning, Economic Policy, and Finance Commission
 Financial, Monetary, and Insurance Policy Committee (2012–2013)
 Plural Economy, Production, and Industry Commission
 Agriculture and Animal Husbandry Committee (2011–2012)
 Education and Health Commission
 Education Committee (Secretary: 2014–2015)
 International Relations and Migrant Protection Commission
 International Relations, Migrant Protection, and International Organizations Committee (2010–2011)

Electoral history

References

Notes

Footnotes

Bibliography

External links 
 Deputies profile Vice Presidency .
 Biographic profile ERBOL .

1980 births
Living people
21st-century Bolivian politicians
21st-century Bolivian women politicians
Bolivian people of Quechua descent
Bolivian politicians of indigenous peoples descent
Bolivian women trade unionists
Members of the Bolivian Chamber of Deputies from Potosí
Movement for Socialism (Bolivia) politicians
People from Chayanta Province
Quechua politicians
Women members of the Chamber of Deputies (Bolivia)